Magic Light Pictures (founded in 2003 by producers Martin Pope and Michael Rose) is an English London-based independent production company, which produces films and manages the children's brand The Gruffalo.

Productions
Since 2009, Magic Light Pictures have produced ten half-hour animated specials based on the best-selling children's story books by Julia Donaldson and Axel Scheffler: The Gruffalo (2009), The Gruffalo's Child (2011), Room on the Broom (2012), Stick Man (2015), The Highway Rat (2017), Zog (2018), The Snail and the Whale (2019), Zog and the Flying Doctors (2020), Superworm (2021) and The Smeds and The Smoos (2022). Their films have won over 40 awards between them, including two Children's BAFTAs and the Prix Jeunesse, and have twice been nominated for an Academy Award for Best Short Animation.

Their most recent production, The Smeds and The Smoos, premiered on BBC One on Christmas Day 2022 at 2:30pm and was watched by more than 8.7 million viewers.

Their other productions include: the Oscar-nominated Revolting Rhymes (2016), a two-part animated adaptation of the Roald Dahl book of the same name; and feature films including the Oscar-nominated Chico & Rita (2010), a Spanish language animated feature; Wild Target (2010), a comedy thriller starring Bill Nighy and Emily Blunt; The English version of Terkel in Trouble, a Danish language animated feature; and Sparkle (2007), a romantic comedy feature starring Shaun Evans and Stockard Channing.

Filmography

Awards and nominations

Licensing  
Magic Light Pictures runs a licensing programme and carries ranges in Sainsbury's, Debenhams, John Lewis, Waterstones, and M&S, among others. Launched in 2009, the licensing programme has markets in Germany, Australia, Scandinavia, New Zealand and the USA. Products available in The Gruffalo brand include plush, stationery, homewares, games, toys and apparel.

Magic Light has won five Licensing Awards for their branded apparel, furniture and Forestry Commission trails.

Brand partnerships 
Magic Light Pictures has several award-winning brand partnerships with organisations including Chessington World of Adventures Resort, Forestry Commission England and Arla milk, among others.

Chessington World of Adventures Resort currently hosts the Gruffalo River Ride Adventure (a dark ride), themed hotel rooms, an arena dedicated to the films and characters, and a food outlet. In March 2019 Chessington launched a Room on the Broom attraction with specifically themed hotel rooms.

Since the year 2014, The Forestry Commission has worked with Magic Light on providing free, self-lead trails based on the Gruffalo brand family on over 20 sites around the UK, as well as offering Gruffalo orienteering, Gruffalo sculptures in several forests, and an augmented reality app, The Gruffalo Spotter.

2019 marked the 20th anniversary of Julia Donaldson and Axel Scheffler's Gruffalo book and 10 years since the premiere of the animated special on BBC One. As part of the celebration, Magic Light partnered with the Royal Mint to release a set of commemorative silver and gold fifty pence collectors' coins, and with the Royal Mail to release a set of bespoke Gruffalo stamps.

Apps

Since 2013, Magic Light Pictures has developed a range of mini-game and augmented reality apps based around the Gruffalo brand family. Room on the Broom: Games and Gruffalo: Games were both nominated for a Children's BAFTA in the Interactive Adapted category in 2014 and 2015 respectively.

The Gruffalo Spotter app, launched in early 2017, is an augmented reality app that works alongside the Forestry Commission trails, where users can follow a set of clues and signs to locate animated characters from the book and take photos with them. The app was nominated at the 2017 BAFTA awards in the Interactive category.

References

External links
IMDB Magic Light Pictures
Magic Light Pictures

2003 establishments in the United Kingdom
British animation studios
Children's television
Entertainment companies of the United Kingdom
Film production companies of the United Kingdom